Portland is a city in Sumner and Robertson counties in Tennessee.  The population was 11,486 in 2010 according estimates by the U.S. census bureau and in 2020 the population was 13,156. Portland is a part of the Nashville Metropolitan Statistical Area.

History
Portland is located on the Highland Rim in extreme northern Middle Tennessee. This region has always been known for excellent agricultural soils, a spectacular wildlife environment and an enjoyable climate.

People were originally attracted from the tobacco belt in Virginia and the Carolinas to the Highland Rim for land speculation and production of dark tobacco. The Highland Rim offered ideal climate and soil conditions for growing dark tobacco. This lucrative crop increased the value of the land, which benefited land speculators in the area. Eventually these speculators moved on to attempt profits elsewhere. The farmers, however, remained.

The oldest local settlement in Portland is Fountain Head, which is located a couple of miles south of Portland. This settlement was founded 1792 by the James Gwin family. Within a century, it grew to include a mill, tobacco factory, post office, a Louisville and Nashville Railroad depot, and a number of local retail stores.

William Nolan built a school near Shun Pike in what is now Portland. This stimulated community growth. Portland was originally called Richland. In 1859, the L&N Railroad opened the Nashville-Bowling Green route through Portland. In the same year, a train depot was built in Richland along the railroad on property owned by Thomas Buntin. Buntin was appointed as the depot's first agent and later became Richland's first postmaster. The depot stimulated development in the village. Even today, the railroad runs directly through the center of town.

The first public high school in Sumner County was originally started as a seminary in 1874. It was later named Sumner County High School and opened in 1915.

In 1887, there were two towns in Tennessee named Richland. Officials of the L&N railroad were worried that a telegraph mix-up might result in a train wreck. Postal customers complained of inconvenience as mail was frequently misdirected between the two Richlands. The Railroad administrators and postal authorities decided that Richland in Sumner County would be renamed as Portland to avoid this confusion. The new name was effective on April 10, 1888. Portland was incorporated in April 1904 by legislation passed by the Tennessee Assembly.

In the second decade of the 21st century, Portland is growing at a fast pace buoyed by the growth of the Nashville Metropolitan Area. Daido America operates its US headquarters in Portland. Companies such as Kyowa America and Unipres have manufacturing plants in the city as well.

Geography

Portland is the northern terminus of U.S. Bicycle Route 23. Portland is considered the strawberry capital of Tennessee.

Climate

Demographics

2020 Census data

As of the 2020 United States census, there were 13,156 people, 4,469 households, and 3,247 families residing in the city.

2010 Census data
As of the 2010 Census Portland had a population of 11,480.  It had a racial and ethnic composition of 90.5% non-Hispanic white, 3.5% black or African American, 0.3% Native American, 0.5% Asian, 0.1% Pacific Islander, 0.1% non-Hispanic from some other race, 1.7% two or more races, and 3.9% Hispanic or Latino.

2000 Census data
At the 2000 census there were 8,458 people in 3,226 households, including 2,377 families, in the city. The population density was 739.7 people per square mile (285.7/km). There were 3,502 housing units at an average density of 306.3 per square mile (118.3/km).  The racial makeup of the city was 94.53% White, 2.70% African American, 0.33% Native American, 0.19% Asian, 1.40% from other races, and 0.86% from two or more races. Hispanic or Latino of any race were 2.29%.

Of the 3,226 households 38.7% had children under the age of 18 living with them, 57.1% were married couples living together, 12.6% had a female householder with no husband present, and 26.3% were non-families. 21.8% of households were one person and 9.9% were one person aged 65 or older. The average household size was 2.62 and the average family size was 3.03.

In the city, the population was 28.1% under the age of 18, 10.6% from 18 to 24, 31.6% from 25 to 44, 18.6% from 45 to 64, and 11.1% 65 or older. The median age was 31 years. For every 100 females, there were 93.4 males. For every 100 females age 18 and over, there were 90.1 males. The median household income was $35,644 and the median family income  was $40,786. Males had a median income of $30,550 versus $21,875 for females. The per capita income for the city was $15,559. About 6.7% of families and 10.5% of the population were below the poverty line, including 13.7% of those under age 18 and 14.1% of those age 65 or over.

Notable people

Corey Brewer, born and raised in Portland; former NBA basketball player 
Ronnie McDowell, born and raised in Portland, country music star

Nearby communities
Nashville
Hendersonville
Gallatin
White House 
Mt. Juliet
Clarksville
Westmoreland
Orlinda
mitchellville
Franklin
Fairfield
Oak Grove
Bethpage

References

External links
Official website of the City of Portland

Cities in Sumner County, Tennessee
Cities in Robertson County, Tennessee
Cities in Tennessee
Populated places established in 1859
1859 establishments in Tennessee
Cities in Nashville metropolitan area